The Auditor-General of New South Wales helps the Parliament of New South Wales hold government accountable for its use of public resources.

The Auditor-General is responsible for audits of NSW Government agencies, universities, and NSW local government, and also provides certain assurance services for Commonwealth grants and payments to the State under Commonwealth legislation. The Auditor-General is the head of the Audit Office of New South Wales (AONSW), a statutory authority established under the Public Finance and Audit Act 1983 to conduct audits for the Auditor-General.

The Auditor-General is independent of the Government, and is accountable to the Parliament of New South Wales and regularly reports on the audits. Parliament promotes independence by ensuring the Auditor-General and AONSW are not compromised in their roles by:
providing that only Parliament, and not the executive government, can remove an Auditor-General
mandating the Auditor-General as auditor of public sector agencies
precluding the Auditor-General from providing non-audit and assurance services

The Legislative Assembly Public Accounts Committee reviews the appointment of the Auditor-General, prior to the official appointment by the Governor of New South Wales.

The Audit Office of New South Wales

The vision of the Audit Office of New South Wales is Our insights inform and challenge government to improve outcomes for citizens. AONSW is headquartered in the Darling Park office precinct in the Sydney central business district, and is a short walk from Town Hall station.

AONSW comprises four branches:
Office of the Auditor-General
Financial Audit
Performance Audit
Corporate Services

Financial Audit and Performance Audit 
The Financial Audit and Performance Audit branches conduct financial and performance audits, principally under the Public Finance and Audit Act 1983 and the Corporations Act 2001, and examines allegations of serious and substantial waste of public money under the Public Interest Disclosures Act 1994. In 2016, the Local Government Act 1993 expanded the Auditor-General's mandate to include financial and performance auditing of NSW local government.

In 2016-17, AONSW completed 426 financial audits of NSW Government agencies and NSW universities, as well as seventeen performance audits. In 2017-18, this increased to 550 financial audits of NSW Government agencies, NSW universities and NSW local councils, and nineteen performance audits, as a result of the mandate to audit NSW local government. The full list of the financial audits and performance audits are included in Appendix Two and Appendix Five of the 2017-18 Annual Report.

Some of the key NSW agencies audited include:
Department of Transport
Roads & Maritime Services
Ministry of Health
Department of Education
Department of Justice
Department of Premier and Cabinet
Department of Customer Service which assumed the functions of the former Department of Finance, Services and Innovation after the 2019 state election
Department of Planning, Industry and Environment
Department of Family and Community Services
NSW Treasury

Office of the Auditor-General 
The Office of the Auditor-General is responsible for audit quality and compliance with Australian Auditing Standards, and incorporates the Professional Service Branch responsible for governance matters and disclosures. It has developed a corporate governance model for the NSW public sector, the Governance Lighthouse, reflecting the eight core Australian Securities Exchange (ASX) Corporate Governance Principles across seventeen major points of good governance. The Governance Lighthouse provides practical advice and resources on implementing successful governance in the public sector.

Corporate Services 
Corporate Services supports the service delivery branches of AONSW and comprises back-office functions including:
Finance
Communications and Business Support
Information Technology Support
Human Resources and Payroll
Learning and Development

Legislative Assembly Public Accounts Committee (PAC)

The Auditor-General and the Audit Office of New South Wales work closely with Legislative Assembly Public Accounts Committee. The committee was first established in 1902 to scrutinise the actions of the executive branch of government on behalf of the Legislative Assembly.

The Public Accounts Committee has responsibilities under Part 4 of the Public Finance and Audit Act 1983 to inquire into and report on activities of government that are reported in the Total State Sector Accounts and the accounts of the State's authorities. A key part of committee activity is following up aspects of the Auditor-General's Reports to Parliament. The committee may also receive referrals from ministers, the Legislative Assembly and the Auditor-General to undertake inquiries. The committee may also recommend improvements to the efficiency and effectiveness of government activities.

History
For more than 185 years, the Audit Office of New South Wales has been assisting the Parliament of New South Wales hold government accountable for its use of public resources. This is done by reporting directly to Parliament on audits of government financial reports and performance.

1824William Lithgow was appointed Colonial Auditor-General, to compile and examine the colony's accounts and report on government departments to the Governor.
1855The UK Constitution Act 1855 formalised government in New South Wales, and the Auditor-General made a political office and member of the government.
1856The Auditor-General ceased to be a political office.
1870Powers and duties of the Auditor-General first set in legislation, in the Audit Act 1870.
1902Audit Act 1902 prohibited the Auditor-General from being a member of the Executive Council or of parliament.
1929Audit (Amendment) Act 1929 changed the tenure of office of the Auditor-General from life to ceasing at 65. Position of Assistant Auditor-General created.
1984Public Finance and Audit Act 1983 established the Auditor-General's Office on 6 January 1984.
1989Auditor-General's Office declared a statutory body, allowing it to be both more independent and more commercial.
1991The Public Finance and Audit Act 1983 expanded the Auditor-General's role to include performance audits, limited tenure to seven years, and prevented acceptance of any other post in the NSW public service.
2001Auditor-General's role expanded to reporting on issues of waste, probity and financial judgement.
2004Auditor-General given power to employ staff directly, and set wages and conditions.
2013Tenure of Auditor-General extended to eight years.
2016The Local Government Act 1993 expanded the Auditor-General's mandate to include financial and performance auditing of local councils and council entities

List of Auditors-General of New South Wales
The following individuals have served as Auditors-General of New South Wales.

Margaret Crawford 
Margaret Crawford commenced as the Auditor-General of New South Wales in April 2016. Crawford has over 20 years of experience as a senior executive across many large, complex public sector organisations - local, State and the Commonwealth governments - including the Victorian Department of Human Services, the Australian Taxation Office, the NSW Roads and Traffic Authority and Australia's largest local government, Brisbane City Council. Most recently, before joining the Audit Office, she held the position of Deputy Secretary at the NSW Department of Family and Community Services. Crawford has worked across a diverse range of sectors, including housing and homelessness, community and disability services, road transport policy and regulation, taxation administration and gaming regulation.

References

External links
 Audit Office of New South Wales
 Parliament of New South Wales
 Public Accounts Committee
 ASX Corporate Governance Principles and Recommendations
 Australian National Audit Office (ANAO) Public Sector Governance - Better Practice Guide
 GIPA Publications Guide

Government of New South Wales
1824 establishments in Australia
Government agencies established in 1824